Argema mimosae, the African moon moth, is a giant silk moth of the family Saturniidae. Similar in appearance to the giant Madagascan moon moth (Argema mittrei), but smaller, this moth can be found widely in Eastern Africa and more locally in Southern Africa, including near the east coast of South Africa. The species was first described by Jean Baptiste Boisduval in 1847. Its forward wings have a distinctive grey-coloured "furry" leading edge, giving a very rough surface, presumably for aerodynamic reasons. Apart from the eye-like markings on its wings, the colouring and shape of the wings give the appearance of a piece of foliage, especially the tail-like structures of the rearmost wings which resemble a dried out leaf stem - presumably for camouflage in its natural environment.

Identification
It is emerald green with yellow and red eyespots on its wings. It has long hindwings, giving the appearance of tails.

Larvae are green with thin white bands and rows of long projections on the back. The cocoons are silvery and pitted with small holes.

Biology
Larvae feed on corkwood (Commiphora), marula (Sclerocarya birrea) and tamboti (Spirostachys africana).

Habitat
In southern Africa, especially subtropical bushveld, there are two broods per year.

References

Mimosae
Moths described in 1847
Moths of Africa